Ashford & Simpson were an American husband-and-wife songwriting, production, recording duo composed of Nickolas Ashford (May 4, 1941 – August 22, 2011) and Valerie Simpson (born August 26, 1946).

Ashford was born in Fairfield, South Carolina, and Simpson in the Bronx, New York City. Afterwards, his family relocated to Ypsilanti, Michigan, where he became a member of Christ Temple Baptist Church. While there, he sang with a group called the Hammond Singers (named after the founding minister, James Hammond). Later, Nickolas attended and graduated from Willow Run High School in Ypsilanti, Michigan, before pursuing his professional career, where he would ultimately meet his wife, Valerie. They met at Harlem's White Rock Baptist Church in 1964. After having recorded unsuccessfully as a duo, they joined an aspiring solo artist and former member of the Ikettes, Joshie Jo Armstead, at the Scepter/Wand label, where their compositions were recorded by Ronnie Milsap ("Never Had It So Good"), Maxine Brown ("One Step at a Time"), as well as the Shirelles, the Guess Who, and Chuck Jackson. Another of the trio's songs, "Let's Go Get Stoned," gave Ray Charles a number one U.S. R&B hit in 1966. That same year, Ashford & Simpson joined Motown, where their best-known songs included "Ain't No Mountain High Enough," "You're All I Need to Get By," "Ain't Nothing Like the Real Thing," and "Reach Out and Touch (Somebody's Hand)." Ashford and Simpson wrote many other hit songs, including Chaka Khan's "I'm Every Woman" (1978) and "Is It Still Good to Ya?", originally recorded by the duo in 1978 and covered by Teddy Pendergrass in 1980.

As performers, Ashford & Simpson's best-known duets are "Solid" (1984) and "Found a Cure" (1979). The duo were inducted into the Songwriters Hall of Fame in 2002. They are also recipients of The Rhythm & Blues Foundation's Pioneer Award, ASCAP Founders Award, and the Grammy Trustee Award. Rolling Stone ranked them No. 19 on its list of the 20 Greatest Duos of All Time.

Career

Songwriters

The duo essentially had two careers: one as a successful writing and producing team and the other as singers and performers themselves. They started their career in the mid-1960s, writing for artists such as the 5th Dimension ("California Soul"), Aretha Franklin ("Cry Like A Baby"), and Ray Charles ("Let's Go Get Stoned"). Their work with Charles brought them to the attention of Motown chief Berry Gordy.

Upon joining the Motown staff in 1966, Ashford & Simpson were paired with the vocal duo Marvin Gaye and Tammi Terrell, and they wrote and/or produced all but one of the late-1960s Gaye/Terrell singles, including hits such as the original version of "Ain't No Mountain High Enough", "Your Precious Love", "Ain't Nothing Like the Real Thing", and "You're All I Need to Get By". According to Gaye in the book Divided Soul, Simpson did most of the vocals on the last album he did with Terrell, Easy, as a way for Terrell's family to have additional income, as she was battling an ultimately fatal brain tumor. Though Louvain Demps, singer of the Andantes, has stated that she saw Terrell recording the album, and Simpson is quoted as saying, in a book written by Terrell's sister, Ludie Montgomery, what they saw was her singing the guide tracks for the album, which were later replaced by Tammi's own vocals.

Ashford & Simpson wrote and produced almost all the songs on three 1970s albums for former Supreme Diana Ross, including her first solo album Diana Ross ("Reach Out and Touch (Somebody's Hand)") and "Ain't No Mountain High Enough", Surrender ("Remember Me"), and The Boss. All three albums were critically acclaimed with Diana Ross, her 1970 album debut, and The Boss being certified platinum and "Surrender" certified gold.

Other Motown artists whom Ashford & Simpson worked with include Gladys Knight & the Pips ("Didn't You Know You'd Have to Cry Sometime", and after Motown they wrote and produced for this group "Landlord", "Bourgie, Bourgie", and "Taste of Bitter Love"), Smokey Robinson & the Miracles ("Who's Gonna Take the Blame"), Syreeta Wright ("I Can't Give Back the Love I Feel for You"), the Marvelettes ("Destination: Anywhere"), Martha Reeves & the Vandellas ("Tear It On Down"), the Dynamic Superiors ("Shoe, Shoe Shine"), Blinky Williams ("I Wouldn't Change the Man He Is"), and the Supremes with the Four Tops (original duets, plus the production of a hit cover of Phil Spector's "River Deep-Mountain High").

Other artists with whom Ashford & Simpson had hits were Teddy Pendergrass ("Is It Still Good to Ya"), the Brothers Johnson ("Ride-O-Rocket"), Stephanie Mills ("Keep Away Girls"), Chaka Khan, both on her own ("I'm Every Woman" and "Clouds"), and with Rufus ("Keep It Comin'" and "Ain't Nothin' But a Maybe").

Performers
Ashford & Simpson's career as recording artists began in the early 1960s as part of the gospel group the Followers, with whom they recorded the album Gospel Meeting (on Forum Circle), later issued as Meetin' The Followers (on Roulette Records). The LP contains their vocals and also four Ashford compositions. In 1964, they recorded "I'll Find You", as "Valerie & Nick". That was followed by several obscure singles recorded by Ashford on the Glover, Verve and ABC labels, such as "It Ain't Like That" (later recorded by Martha Reeves & the Vandellas), "California Soul", and "Dead End Kids", backed by his own version of "Let's Go Get Stoned".

Simpson appeared (with Melba Moore) as part of the "Blood, Sweat & Tears Soul Chorus" on the band's debut album Child Is Father to the Man in 1968. After concentrating on working with other artists, Simpson was the featured soloist on the songs "Bridge Over Troubled Water" and "What's Going On" on the Quincy Jones albums Gula Matari in 1970, and its follow-up, Smackwater Jack.

Simpson subsequently recorded two solo LPs for Motown: Exposed in 1971, and, the following year, Valerie Simpson, which included the single "Silly, Wasn't I", which was later sampled on 50 Cent's "Best Friend" from the movie, Get Rich or Die Tryin'. The song was also sampled by 9th Wonder on Murs's "Silly Girl" in the album, Murray's Revenge. Ashford & Simpson were featured singing selections from Simpson's solo albums on the PBS TV show Soul!, hosted by Ellis Haizlip in 1971. In 1973, they left Motown after the albums Simpson recorded for the label received poor promotion, and the company refused to release an album of the duo recording a collection of their most famous songs for other artists.

In 1974, Ashford and Simpson married after resuming their career as a duo, with the Warner Bros. album Gimme Something Real released in 1973, followed in 1974 by I Wanna Be Selfish. In 1975, Simpson sang backing vocals on Paul Simon's number-one hit "50 Ways to Leave Your Lover", and in 1976 they released Come As You Are. 1977 saw the release of two albums – So So Satisfied and Send it. This was followed by the hit singles "Send It", "Don't Cost You Nothin'" (1977), "It Seems To Hang On" (1978), "Is It Still Good To Ya" (1978), "Found a Cure" (1979), "Street Corner" (1982), and their biggest hit, "Solid", released in 1984.

In 1978, they were featured as vocalists, along with Chaka Khan, on the hit single "Stuff Like That" from Quincy Jones' Sounds... And Stuff Like That album and contributed to the writing of the soundtrack to The Wiz. The duo appeared as themselves in "Nocturne", a 1986 episode of the popular television series The Equalizer.

On his own, Ashford (along with Frank Wilson) produced the hit "I'm Gonna Make You Love Me", which Diana Ross & the Supremes recorded in collaboration with the Temptations in 1968. He also appeared in the movie New Jack City (1991), as Reverend Oates, an ordained minister who was part of Nino Brown's entourage.

Simpson's brothers were in the record business as well: Ray Simpson replaced Victor Willis in the Village People and their brother Jimmy Simpson produced the group GQ (which had big hits with "Disco Nights (Rock-Freak)" and "I Do Love You"), and was in great demand as a mixing engineer during the disco era.

Recent years and Ashford's death
In latter times, Ashford & Simpson recorded and toured sporadically, and in 1996, they opened a restaurant and live entertainment venue, Sugar Bar in New York City, with an open mic on Thursday nights, where performers included Queen Latifah, Vickie Natale and Felicia Collins. Ashford & Simpson recorded the album Been Found with poet Maya Angelou in 1996. Around that time, they were also featured disc jockeys on New York radio station WRKS.

On August 16, 2006, Playbill Online reported that they were writing the score for a musical based on E. Lynn Harris's novel Invisible Life. In January 2007, they, along with Tina Turner, Mary J. Blige, Mariah Carey, Sidney Poitier, director Spike Lee, and comedian Chris Rock accompanied Oprah Winfrey when she opened her Leadership Academy for Girls in South Africa.

They were given writing credit on Amy Winehouse's 2007 CD Back to Black for the single "Tears Dry on Their Own". The track is based on a sample of Marvin Gaye and Tammi Terrell's 1967 Motown hit "Ain't No Mountain High Enough". They had begun performing their act in small, intimate venues, such as Feinstein's at the Regency in New York and the Rrazz Room in San Francisco, and in January 2009, they released a CD and DVD of their live performances titled The Real Thing. On June 22, 2009, they made a guest performance at a party at Tribeca Rooftop, New York, to celebrate Virgin Atlantic's birthday party. They also made their first appearance in Tokyo, Japan, in November 2009, and performed eight shows in four days at Blue Note Tokyo.

At President Barack Obama's 2009 inauguration, Ashford and Simpson rewrote their song, "Solid", as "Solid as Barack". They dedicated it to him at his inaugural festivities.

Ashford died in a New York City hospital on August 22, 2011, four days before Valerie Simpson's 65th birthday, of complications from throat cancer. His publicist, Liz Rosenberg, said that he had undergone radiation therapy to treat his illness.

Simpson released a new solo album in June 2012, called Dinosaurs Are Coming Back Again, which also features the last recorded performance of Nina Simone, a second duet with Roberta Flack and an instrumental version of "Ain't No Mountain High Enough".

In 2014, Simpson made a guest appearance on the title track to Kindred the Family Soul's album A Couple Friends.

In May 2014, Simpson was awarded an Honorary Doctorate of Music from Berklee College of Music.

Personal life
Nick Ashford and Valerie Simpson had two daughters, Nicole (born in 1975), and Asia (born in 1987). Nicole graduated from Wesleyan University in 1997.

Awards and nominations 
In 1969, Ashford and Simpson won three BMI Awards for the songs "Ain't No Mountain High Enough," "Ain't Nothing Like the Real Thing," and "Your Precious Love."

Ashford and Simpson were inducted Songwriters Hall of Fame in 2002. They were also recipients of The Rhythm & Blues Foundation's Pioneer Award in 1999, and ASCAP's highest honor, the Founders Award, which they received in 1996.

Grammy Awards 
Ashford and Simpson were nominated for three Grammy Awards. In 2019, they received the Grammy Trustees Award.

|-
| 1985
| Ashford And Simpson
| Best Video, Short Form
| 
|-
| 1986
| Solid
| Best R&B Performance by a Duo or Group with Vocal
| 
|-
| 1987
| Real Love
| Best R&B Performance by a Duo or Group with Vocal
|

Discography

Studio albums

Live albums

Compilation albums
The Best of Ashford & Simpson (1993, Capitol)
Capitol Gold: The Best of Ashford & Simpson (1996, Capitol)
The Gospel According to Ashford & Simpson: Count Your Blessings (1996, EMI)
The Very Best of Ashford & Simpson (2002, Warner Bros./Rhino)
The Warner Bros. Years: Hits, Remixes & Rarities (2008, Rhino)
Love Will Fix It: The Warner Bros. Records Anthology 1973-1981 (2018, Groove Line)

Singles

 Singles credited to Valerie & Nick
 Ashford & Simpson and Khan sang uncredited co-lead vocals on "Stuff Like That"

Solo recordings

Valerie Simpson
Listed below are solo recordings made by Valerie Simpson.

Albums

Singles

Nick Ashford
Listed below are solo recordings made by Nick Ashford.

Singles
1966: "I Don't Need No Doctor"
1967: "When I Feel the Need" 
1968: "California Soul" 
1970: "Dead End Kids"

See also
List of Number 1 Dance Hits (United States)
List of artists who reached number one on the US Dance chart

References

External links
 Nickolas Ashford Profile and Nickolas Ashford Song Catalog at Songwriters Hall of Fame
 Valerie Simpson Profile and Valerie Simpson Song Catalog at Songwriters Hall of Fame
 Ashford and Simpson information site
 
 

African-American musical groups
African-American singer-songwriters
American rhythm and blues singer-songwriters
Musical groups from New York (state)
Musical groups established in 1964
Motown artists
Family musical groups
American rhythm and blues musical groups
American disco groups
American dance music groups
American musical duos
Disco duos
Male–female musical duos
Rhythm and blues duos
Record production duos
American songwriting teams
Married couples
Rak Records artists
Record producers from New York (state)
Singer-songwriters from New York (state)
People from Ypsilanti, Michigan
Singer-songwriters from Michigan